The University of New Hampshire Franklin Pierce School of Law is a public law school in Concord, New Hampshire, associated with the University of New Hampshire. It is the only law school in the state and was founded in 1973 by Robert H. Rines as the Franklin Pierce Law Center, named after the 14th President of the United States and New Hampshire native. (Pierce was the only U.S. President from the state of New Hampshire.) The school is particularly well known for its Intellectual Property Law program.

History

The University of New Hampshire Franklin Pierce School of Law was founded in 1973 as the Franklin Pierce Law Center, becoming the first law school in New Hampshire.  On April 27, 2010, Franklin Pierce Law Center formally signed an affiliation agreement with the University of New Hampshire. The school was renamed the University of New Hampshire School of Law when the affiliation became effective. At the alumni reception during the INTA Annual Meeting in 2019, Dean Carpenter announced the incorporation of "Franklin Pierce" back into the school's name. The school was renamed the University of New Hampshire Franklin Pierce School of Law.

As of the 2023 rankings, among all ranked law schools in the United States, U.S. News & World Report ranked UNH Franklin Pierce Law 105th.  The school was ranked 48th by Above the Law's 2018 rankings which are outcome (i.e. bar passage rate and employment results) oriented, but was unranked in 2022. Pierce has been among the top 10 intellectual property law schools in the United States for the past 25 years. In its 2021 ranking of "America's Best Intellectual Property Law Programs", U.S. News & World Report ranked UNH Law's program 4th in the nation in the intellectual property specialty rankings. Among online law schools, UNH was ranked #1 by Best Value Schools in 2022.

Academic programs
The UNH Franklin Pierce School of Law offers a residential Juris Doctor (JD) program, as well as Master's degree, joint degree, and dual degree programs.

The masters-level programs in law include the Master of Laws (LLM) in Intellectual Property (L.L.M-IP), Master of Laws in Commerce and Technology (LLM-CT), and Master of Laws in International Criminal Law and Justice (L.L.M-ICLJ). The school also confers a Masters of Intellectual Property (MIP), making it one of the only law schools in the United States offering a graduate degree in intellectual property specially designed for scientists, engineers and any interested persons not holding a law degree.

The law school also collaborates with the greater University of New Hampshire System to offer three dual degree programs: JD/MBA with the Peter T. Paul College of Business and Economics, JD/MPP with the Carsey School of Public Policy, and a JD/MSW.

Students who complete specialized coursework may earn a Certificate in Entertainment Law, Health Law & Policy, Sports & Entertainment Law, Sports Law, or Intellectual Property Law.

Centers and institutes 

 Franklin Pierce Center for Intellectual Property
 Sports and Entertainment Law Institute
 Warren B. Rudman Center for Justice, Leadership, & Public Service

Hybrid JD Program 
In 2019, UNH Franklin Pierce School of Law welcomed its first Hybrid JD class. Students in the Hybrid program earn their JD in three and a half years and complete their classes through a mix of in-person and remote instruction. Hybrid students come to the school for an intensive immersion program over the course of one weekend every month. The Hybrid program focuses on Intellectual Property ("IP"), Technology, and Information Law. Hybrid students are typically already full-time professionals in the IP, technology, or privacy spheres. The Hybrid JD program is ABA-approved and is the first Hybrid JD program with a focus in IP.

Daniel Webster Scholar Honors Program

In 2005, the New Hampshire Supreme Court launched an alternative bar licensing process at the UNH School of Law. The Daniel Webster Scholar Honors Program, a collaboration of the Court, the law school, the New Hampshire Board of Bar Examiners, and the New Hampshire Bar Association, is an intensive practice-based honors program that encompasses the last two years of law school. Students apply to the program during the spring of their 1L (first) year. Enrollment in the program is limited to 20 students per class year.  Once accepted to the program, students go through a rigorous program of clinical experiences under the supervision of judges, lawyers, and bar examiners, and compile a portfolio of work. Graduates of the program must pass the Multistate Professional Responsibility Examination (MPRE) and meet character and fitness requirements to be admitted to the New Hampshire bar, but are exempt from taking the state's bar examination. Daniel Webster Scholar graduates may still qualify to sit for the bar examination in any other U.S. jurisdiction.  The first class of Webster Scholars graduated in 2008.

Exchange programs
In February 2011, UNH Law entered into an exchange agreement with Shanghai Jiao Tong University, KoGuan Law School, allowing students from each institution to enroll abroad for a semester. Classes in both countries are taught in English, and credits will transfer to the student's home school. The school holds several summer programs in the law that are open to students from other schools, including the China Intellectual Property Summer Institute in cooperation with Tsinghua University Law School in Beijing; the eLaw Summer Institute in collaboration with the University College Cork Faculty of Law in Cork, Ireland; the Intellectual Property Summer Institute, hosted at New Hampshire Law's main campus; and the Advanced Topics in International Criminal Law and Justice Seminar in Washington, D.C.

Clinics 
There are five clinics where student attorneys, mentored by an experienced and licensed attorney, assist low-income people with their legal matters. The New Hampshire Supreme Court allows second- and third-year law students to appear in court with a bar-licensed mentor. The clinical programs include work in Civil Practice, Criminal Practice, Immigration Law, Intellectual Property & Transaction, and International Technology Transfer.

Intellectual Property Summer Institute 
The school also hosts the Intellectual Property Summer Institute (IPSI), where students and professionals from around the world gather to take IP courses and attend seminars from prominent IP practitioners and scholars. IPSI was first established in 1987, and was brought back in a completely virtual format in 2020.

Employment
According to the 2019 ABA Employment Summary Report, 96.7% of the Class of 2019 obtained employment within ten months after graduation. 80% of graduates from the Class of 2019 were employed in bar passage-required jobs. The school is ranked 1st in New England and 5th in the U.S. for jobs on the open market.

Cost
The tuition at the University of New Hampshire School of Law for the 2018–2019 academic year was $37,401 for NH residents and $41,401 for non-residents. The Law School Transparency estimated debt-financed cost of attendance for three years is $201,783; however, only 1.9% of students pay full price.

Students
For the class entering in 2021, UNH Franklin Pierce School of Law accepted 49.70% of applicants with 37.44% of those accepted enrolling, while the enrolled students had an average 158 LSAT score and 3.5 college GPA.  Students from around the world attend UNH Franklin Pierce School of Law, and the school celebrates the traditions and cultures of its many international students throughout the year. The school hosts events such as Lunar New Year, the Indian "festival of lights" or Diwali, an Afro-Caribbean Night and a Christmas party. Each summer, UNH Law holds the Intellectual Property Summer Institute, during which student barbecues have become a tradition on evenings during summer. During Orientation Week, students partake in an annual ice cream social. Fall midterms are closely followed by the Buck Bowl, an intramural touch football tournament. The annual Barrister's Ball is organized by the Student Bar Association and takes place in the spring. With a tradition rich in public service, the school hosts the Bruce Friedman Community Service Day each year, honoring the late professor Bruce E. Friedman, an advocate of social justice.

Organizations
Students run a variety of professional and cultural organizations, including the Student Bar Association (SBA) which serves as the student government. Students participate in two law journals—IDEA: The Law Review of the Franklin Pierce Center for Intellectual Property and the University of New Hampshire Law Review—and send Moot Court teams to competitions around the United States.

Publications
 University of New Hampshire Law Review, formerly Pierce Law Review.
 IDEA: The Law Review of the Franklin Pierce Center for Intellectual Property, a student-run academic law journal and nationally acclaimed intellectual property law journal
 Pierce Law Magazine, an alumni magazine with a focus on the accomplishments of alumni
 UNH Sports Law Review, a student-run academic law journal focusing on sports law

Notable faculty 
John T. Broderick Jr. (b. 1947), former Dean and President; former New Hampshire Supreme Court Chief Justice
John D. Hutson (b. 1947), former Dean and President
Michael McCann (b. 1976), Sportico contributor, former Sports Illustrated attorney and writer, and director of the UNH Sports and Entertainment Law Institute
Dana Remus, former property law professor and current White House counsel to the Biden Administration
Mary W. S. Wong, founding director for the Center for Intellectual Property, subsequently an executive with ICANN

Notable alumni
Carol Ann Conboy (b. 1947), New Hampshire Supreme Court justice
Samuel Der-Yeghiayan (b. 1952), United States federal judge for the Northern District of Illinois
Donna Edwards (b. 1958), former U.S. Representative (D–Maryland 4th District)
Frank Guinta (b. 1970), former mayor of Manchester, New Hampshire, and former U.S. Representative (R–New Hampshire 1st District) (Master of Intellectual Property)
Evelyn Handler (1933–2011), former president of the University of New Hampshire and Brandeis University
John Hart (b. 1965), author of The Last Child
Paul Jabour (b. 1956), Rhode Island state senator
Roger Manno (b. 1966), Maryland state senator
William J. Murphy (b. 1963), former Speaker of the House, Rhode Island House of Representatives
Tim Ryan (b. 1973), former U.S. Representative (D–Ohio 13th District)
 Matt Soper (b. 1984), current member of the Colorado House of Representatives and first Seventh-day Adventist to serve as member of the Colorado Legislature
Donna Soucy (b. 1967), New Hampshire state senator

References

External links

Official website

Buildings and structures in Concord, New Hampshire
Educational institutions established in 1973
1973 establishments in New Hampshire
Law schools in New Hampshire
Universities and colleges in Merrimack County, New Hampshire
Education in Concord, New Hampshire
University of New Hampshire